Charlie Watkins may refer to:
 Charlie Watkins (footballer)
 Charlie Watkins (audio engineer)

See also
 Charles Watkins (disambiguation)